Kharkivska or Kharkivski may refer to:
 Kharkivska (Kyiv Metro), a station of the Kyiv Metro
 Kharkivska oblast or Kharkiv Oblast
 Kharkivski Sokoly, a Ukrainian basketball club based in Kharkiv

People with the surname
 Yuliya Kharkivska (born 1976), Ukrainian alpine skier